Agriocnemis pieris, white dartlet, is a species of damselfly in the family Coenagrionidae. It is found in India and is likely to extend into Bangladesh.

Description and habitat
It is a slender, small damselfly but very conspicuous with its bluish white color with dorsal black spots. Its eyes are pale blue with a black cap, thorax is black on dorsum and pale blue on the sides. Its abdomen is pale blue, deepening on the last four segments. They are marked with black on dorsum up to segment 8. Agriocnemis lacteola lacks these dorsal black marks on segments 4 to 10 of the abdomen. Female is similar to the male; but more robust and the blue is more dark. Its abdomen is marked with black up to segment 9. There is a narrow longitudinal lateral stripe of blue on segment 8. The females of this species exhibit sexual mimicry. One group mimics the males’ colour (androchromes). Other groups will have their own female colouration (gynochromes).

It breeds in marshes and wet grasslands.

See also
 List of odonates of India
 List of odonata of Kerala

References

External links

Insects of India
Coenagrionidae
Insects described in 1919